This is a list of Mountain Ridges in these municipalities of Puerto Rico.

Aguada
Cuchilla de Juan González
Cabo Rojo
La Cuchilla
Cayey
Monte Llano
Ceiba
Cuchilla El Duque
Coamo
Cerro de la Mesa
Las Piedras Chiquitas
Fajardo
Cuchilla Naranjo
Guánica
Cerro de Abra
Gurabo
Chuchilla de Hato Nuevo
Hormigueros
Cuchilla Los Matos
Juncos
Cuchila El Asomante
Cuchilla de Santa Inés
Loíza
Maricao
Chuchilla de Bucarabones
Cuchillas Aceitunas
Ponce
Cuchilla de Monte Llano
Utuado
Cuchilla Buena Vista
El Alto
Yabucoa
Cuchilla de Panduras
Yauco
Cuchilla Ranchera

See also

List of mountain ranges of Puerto Rico
List of Puerto Rico state forests

External links
Puerto Rico Guide from Satellite

Ridges